3/4 is a 2017 Bulgarian drama film directed by Ilian Metev. It was screened in the Discovery section at the 2017 Toronto International Film Festival.

Cast
 Mila Mihova as Mila
 Nikolay Mashalov as Niki
 Todor Veltchev as Todor

References

External links
 

2017 films
2017 drama films
Bulgarian drama films
2010s Bulgarian-language films